A great number of airlines and air forces from several countries included the Douglas DC-6 in their fleets at some point in time. Today most DC-6s are inactive, stored, or preserved in museums; although a number are still flying in northern bush operations in Alaska and Canada, while several are based in Europe and a few other DC-6s are still in operation for small carriers in South America.

Below are listed known operators of this airplane, both past and present (♠ indicate Original operators).

Civil operators

Brothers Air Service (BASCO)

Ariana Afghan Airlines
 Antigua
Seagreen Air Transport

Aerolíneas Argentinas
Aerolineas Ini y Cia
Aerotransportes Litoral Argentino (ALA)
Austral
  (FAMA) ♠

Australian National Airlines (ANA) ♠
Ansett-ANA
British Commonwealth Pacific Airlines
Trans Australia Airlines

Belgian International Air Services
Delta Air Transport
Inair
Sabena ♠
Sobelair
Transpommair

Lloyd Aereo Boliviano
 (Servicios Aereos Virgen de Copacabna)

Lóide Aéreo Nacional ♠
Panair do Brasil
Real Transportes Aéreos
Varig
VASP

Air Cambodge
Royal Air Cambodge

Buffalo Airways
Canadian Pacific Air Lines ♠
CP Air
Maritime Central Airways ♠
Nordair
Pacific Western
Transair
Wardair Canada

Transocean

ALFA Chile - Aerolineas Flecha Austral
 Lineas Aereas del Cobre (Ladeco)
 Lineas Aerea Nacional de Chile (LAN Chile) ♠
Lineas Aereas Sud Americana (LASA)
Solastral
Taxpa - Taxis Aereos del Pacifico
Transglobal

Aerovias Condor de Colombia
Aerocosta
Lineas Aereos Taxader
Rutas Aereas Soceidad Aerea Medellin
Tampa Cargo

Lineas Aereas Costarricenses (LACSA)
Transportes Aereos de Integracion (TAISAP)

Nordair
Sterling Airways

Compania Dominicana de Aviacion (CDA)

Aerolineas Nacionales del Ecuador (ANDES)
Ecuatoriana

United Arab Airlines

Aerolineas El Salvador

Ethiopian Air Lines ♠

Finlantic
Kar Air

Aeromaritime d'Affretement
Agile Azur
Air France
Air Inter
Airnautic
Compagnie de Transports Aeriens Intercontinentaux (TAI) ♠
Trans-Union
Union Aéromaritime de Transport (UAT) ♠

Elbeflug
Germanair
Luft-Lloyd
Sudflug
Sudwestflug
Transportflug

Olympic Airways ♠

Aviateca

ADSA

Sahsa
Transportes Aéreos Nacionales

Cathay Pacific Airways ♠

Icelandair
Loftleidir

Bayu Indonesia
PN Aerial Survey
Trans Nusantara Airways
Zamrud Airlines

Iran Air
Persian Air Services

Alitalia ♠
Linee Aeree Italiane (LAI) ♠
Societa Aerea Mediterranea (SAM)

Air Afrique

Japan Air Lines ♠

Air Jordan
Alia

Kuwait Airways Corporation
Trans Arabia Airways 

Lao United Airlines
Royal Air Lao

Air Liban ♠
Lebanese International Airways
Trans Mediterranean Airways

Libavia

Interocean Airways

Madair

Malta International Airways

Aerocarga
Aeronaves de Mexico
Aeromexico
Guest Aerovias Mexico
Mexicana de Aviación ♠
SAESA

Namibia Commercial Aviation

 Lineas Aereas de Nicaragua (Lanica)

KLM ♠
Transavia

Caraibische Lucht Transport Mij NV (CLTM)

Tasman Empire Airways (TEAL)

Pan African Airlines

Braathens South American and Far East Airtransport
Fred. Olsen Airtransport

Aerovías Panamá
Aero Fletes Internacionales (AFISA)
Internacional de Aviacio (Inair)
Rutas Aereas Panemenas (RAPSA)

Aerolineas Peruanas
Faucett

Filipinas Orient Airways
Philippine Airlines ♠

TAP
SATA
 (Goa)
Transportes Aéreos da Índia Portuguesa (TAIP)

Civil Air Transport ♠
Far Eastern Air Transport
Winner Airways

Saudi Arabian Airlines

Saber Air

Central African Airways Corporation (CAAC)

Air Vietnam

Aviaco
Spantax DC-6B, DC-6B-ST
TASSA

Aero-Nord
Internord Aviation
Osterman Aero
Transair Sweden
 
SAS ♠

Balair
Swissair ♠

Syrian Arab Airlines

Thai Airways International

British West Indian Airways

Air Ferry
Air Atlantique, now West Atlantic; a former cargo carrier based in Coventry, England.
British Eagle
British United Airways
Caledonian Airways
Cloudmaster
Cunard Eagle Airways
Eagle Aviation Ltd
Hunting-Clan Air Transport ♠
Lloyd International Airways

Aaxico Airlines
Admiral Airlines
Aero Union
Air America
Air Cargo Express
Alaska Airlines
All American Airlines
American Airlines ♠
ASA International
BirdAir
Braniff International Airways ♠
Capital Airlines
Conner Airlines
Continental Airlines ♠
Currey Air Transport
Delta Air Lines ♠
Eastern Air Lines
Everts Air
Flying Tiger Line ♠
General Airways
Great Lakes Airlines ♠
Hawaiian Airlines
Holiday Airlines (US airline)
International Airlines
Lance Air Transport
Los Angeles Air Service
Los Angeles Dodgers, Major League Baseball team, DC-6B used for one season (1961)
 Macavia International (spraying)
Mackey Airlines
Mercer Airlines
NASA
National Airlines ♠

North American Airlines  ♠
Northeast Airlines
Northern Air Cargo 
Northeast Airlines ♠
Northwest Orient Airlines ♠
Overseas National Airways ♠
Pacific Southwest Airlines
Pan American-Grace Airways ♠
Pan American World Airways ♠
President Airlines
Purdue Aeronautics
Reeve Aleutian Airways
Riddle Airlines ♠
Shamrock Air Lines
 Sis-Q Flying Service (spraying)
Slick Airways ♠
Southern Air Transport
Span East Airlines
Standard Airways
Trans Alaskan Airlines
Trans American Airlines ♠
Trans Caribbean Airways ♠
Trans International Airlines
Transocean Air Lines
Twentieth Century Aircraft
United Air Lines ♠
Universal Airlines
US Overseas Airlines
Western Airlines ♠
Winner Airways
World Airways
Zantop Air Transport

Avensa
Rutas Aereas Nacionales (RANSA)

Yemen Airlines

Adria Airways
Inex-Adria
Jugoslovenski Aerotransport {JAT} ♠

Military operators

 Argentine Air Force

 Belgian Air Force (Four operated from 1960)

 Bolivian Air Force

 Brazilian Air Force

 Chilean Air Force

 Chinese Nationalist Air Force

 Colombian Air Force

 Ecuadorian Air Force

 Salvadoran Air Force

 French Air Force
 French Navy

 German Air Force

 Guatemalan Air Force

 Honduran Air Force

 Italian Air Force operated six former civilian aircraft from 1962 until 1981

 Republic of Korea Air Force

 Mexican Air Force

 Royal New Zealand Air Force
No. 40 Squadron RNZAF

 Panama Air Force

 Paraguayan Air Force

 Peruvian Air Force

 Portuguese Air Force

United States Air Force ♠
United States Navy ♠

 Republic of Vietnam Air Force

 Yugoslav Air Force

 Zambian Air Force

References 

DC-6